The Planets is an documentary miniseries produced by the BBC and A&E and released in 1999. The series was remastered in 2004. It documents the Solar System and its nature, formation, and discovery by humans during the Space Age. The series of eight episodes includes a substantial amount of archival footage from both the United States and Soviet space programs. It also depicts the Solar System through computer graphics. There were a total of eight episodes produced for the series. The series featured appearances from famous pioneering space scientists and explorers, and was narrated by Samuel West in the original 1999 edition, and Mark Halliley in the 2004 remastered edition.

Episodes

Commentators in episode 1 include Hal Levison, George Wetherill, and David Levy.

Commentators in episode 4 include Apollo 17 Lunar Module Pilot Harrison Schmidt, while episode 5 features Apollo 12 Commander Charles Conrad and solar physicist Eugene Parker (of whom the NASA Parker Solar Probe was named in tribute), episode 6 retired USAF Colonel and Project Excelsiot pilot Joe Kittinger, and episode 8 Apollo 17 Commander and last human to walk on the Moon Eugene Cernan.

Commentators in episode 5 include Douglas Gough. It also talks about Angelo Secchi who pioneered the field of astronomical spectroscopy.

Other notable commentators include James Van Allen, Sergei Khrushchev (son of Nikita Khrushchev and aerospace engineer), Alexei Leonov, Boris Chertok and Carolyn Porco.

DVD release
The DVD of the series was released on 24 January 2000.

Book
A hardcover book accompanying the series broadcast was released on 22 April 1999. The Planets. David McNab and James Younger. Yale University Press.

External links

References

 

1999 British television series debuts
1999 British television series endings
1990s British documentary television series
Documentary television series about astronomy
Science education television series
BBC television documentaries about science
English-language television shows
Documentary films about outer space